The Nanhu Riverside Park is a park along the Keelung River in Taipei, Taiwan. The park is divided into two parts by the river, the northern part which is located in Neihu District on the right side of the river bank and the southern part which is located in Nangang District on the left side of the river bank.

Features
The Nanhu Bridge located within the park connects both sides of the park for traffic vehicles and pedestrians.

Transportation
The park is accessible within walking distance north west of Nangang Software Park Station of Taipei Metro.

See also
 List of parks in Taiwan

References

External links

Parks in Taipei